The Canterbury-Bankstown Bulldogs are an Australian professional rugby league football club based in Belmore, a suburb in the Canterbury-Bankstown region of Sydney. They compete in the NRL Telstra Premiership, as well as competitions facilitated by the New South Wales Rugby League, including the Canterbury Cup NSW, the Jersey Flegg Cup, Harvey Norman Women's Premiership, Tarsha Gale Cup, S. G. Ball Cup and the Harold Matthews Cup.

The club was admitted to the New South Wales Rugby Football League premiership, predecessor of the current NRL competition, in 1935. They won their first premiership in their fourth year of competition with another soon after, and after spending the 1950s and most of the 1960s on the lower rungs went through a very strong period in the 1980s, winning four premierships in that decade.

Known briefly in the 1990s as the Sydney Bulldogs, as a result of the Super League war the club competed in that competition in 1997 before changing their name to the geographically indistinct Bulldogs and continuing to play every season of the re-unified NRL, winning their most recent premiership in 2004. In 2012, Canterbury won the minor premiership, but lost to the Melbourne Storm 14-4 in the grand final. In 2014, they came from 7th to make the grand final against South Sydney, but lost 30-6.

History

In 1935—thirteen years after a meeting above "The Ideal Milk Bar" in Campsie led to the creation of the Canterbury-Bankstown Junior Rugby League—the Canterbury club was admitted into the elite New South Wales Rugby Football League premiership. It took the new club, nicknamed "Country Bumpkins" because of their rural recruiting and CB emblem, four years to win their first premiership in 1938. The grand final-winning effort was repeated in 1942 before a 38-year premiership drought.

In 1967, having ended the 11-year premiership reign of St. George by defeating them in the final, "The Berries" (as they were known at the time) lost to South Sydney in the grand final. But the return to the top end of the table set the scene for off-field restructuring that laid the foundations for the club to become one of the most consistent achievers in the remaining decades of the 20th century.

In 1978, Canterbury became known as "The Bulldogs". Nicknames such as "Cantabs" "CBs" and "Berries" were seen to be "soft" and the club wanted something to signify determination and grit. The new name and logo was purchased from a local Sydney Liquor Store owner Bill Caralis. A grand final appearance in 1979, followed by a grand final win in 1980 with a young, enthusiastic and free-running side dubbed "The Entertainers", was the beginning of a golden era that was to produce three more grand final wins in the 1980s: 1984, 1985 and 1988.

During the mid-1990s' Super League war, Canterbury aligned themselves with the Super League competition, playing in the 1997 premiership season. In 1998 the Bulldogs came close to adding another premiership trophy after qualifying for the grand final where they met the Brisbane Broncos and lost 38-12. On the way to the 1998 Grand Final, Canterbury had two come-from-behind wins. The first was against the Newcastle Knights in the third week of the finals—behind 16-0 in the second half, they fought back to 16 all at full time and went on to win in extra time. A week later they trailed arch rivals Parramatta in the preliminary final by 16 points with 9 minutes remaining. Three tries and a conversion from the sideline by Daryl Halligan in the final minutes got them back level at 18 all and send the game into extra-time. Canterbury eventually went on to win 32-20 in one of the greatest finals comebacks in the history of the game.

Following indifferent form in 1999, 2000 and 2001 where they had varying levels of success, the club was found to have systematically and deliberately breached the NRL salary cap in 2002 (for the 2001–02 seasons), and was penalized all 37 competition points which it had amassed up to that point for 2002. This resulted in the club falling from first to last place on the ladder, and at the end of the season the Bulldogs received their first "wooden spoon" (a reference to the club which finishes last in the competition) since 1964.

The Bulldogs returned to finals contention in 2003; however, they fell one step short of yet another grand final after losing to the Roosters 28-18 in the preliminary final.

The club went through some off-field dramas in 2004, the most serious of which included rape allegations during a pre-season match in Coffs Harbour. The team managed to focus on football and triumphed when they held out the Sydney Roosters 16-13 with a try-saving tackle by Andrew Ryan in the dying seconds of the 2004 Grand Final. The game was to be the last for departing captain Steve Price, but he missed the match due to a leg injury. Price is now taking over at the club as the General Manager of Football,  this position becoming effective in 2020 as he looks to turn the club's fortunes around to that of 2004.

2005 saw Canterbury-Bankstown unable to mount a serious defence of their premiership title as injuries and contract negotiations saw the year start and finish on a sour note for the club. Due to the extent of injuries suffered, the team was under-strength for most of the year. This took its toll in the final six weeks of the season, with the club suffering successive heavy losses and missing the finals series. In 2006, little was expected from the club after a poor 2005 season, but despite some doubt over the strength of their side, Canterbury's forward pack helped them to a better than expected result for the year, finishing a game short of the grand final, losing to eventual premiers the Brisbane Broncos. Inconsistency and a poor finish to the 2007 season meant Canterbury were knocked out of the finals in week two.

In 2008, having already lost Mark O'Meley to the Sydney Roosters, Willie Mason left the club. Further into the off-season Canterbury-Bankstown also lost halfback Brent Sherwin, and prospects for the 2008 NRL season began to look dim. Although they recorded at the start of the season a couple of victories, the injury toll and the departure Sonny Bill Williams mid-season demoralized the club and players, and the Canterbury-Bankstown club earned their second wooden spoon of the decade.

Another source of discontent in 2008 was the battle for election to the football club board. Many contenders believed that the board of the time was steering the club in the wrong direction, particularly then-CEO Malcolm Noad. New members were elected to the board early in 2008, and later in the season Noad resigned as CEO. His replacement as head of the football club was Todd Greenberg.

Greenberg's influence became apparent during the 2009 season. Premiership-winning coach Steve Folkes was replaced with his assistant Kevin Moore. The purchases of several key players, including former Melbourne and Cronulla playmaker Brett Kimmorley changed Canterbury from a poorly run and poorly performing club to one of the best clubs both on and off the field in 2009. Canterbury finished second in the regular season (losing the minor premiership to the St. George Illawarra Dragons due to a loss of two competition points for an interchange breach against Penrith in Round 2), and players and officials took out a number of Dally M awards. 2009 was also the final season for Hazem El Masri, who became the highest all-time pointscorer in Australian rugby league history with a penalty goal in the Bulldogs' Round 1 match against the Manly-Warringah Sea Eagles.

From 2010, Canterbury-Bankstown returned to the name Canterbury-Bankstown Bulldogs. The Canterbury-Bankstown club celebrated its 75th anniversary in 2010.

In the 2012 NRL season, Canterbury finished first on the competition ladder to take out their first minor premiership since 1994. They made it to the grand final, losing to Melbourne 14-4.

In May 2013, former Netball New Zealand chief executive Raelene Castle was appointed CEO, the first female in the NRL's history. They finished the regular season sixth on the ladder and bowed out in the semi final.

In 2014, Canterbury-Bankstown made history by winning three consecutive games by one point, from Round 5 to Round 7. They finished runners up to South Sydney in the 2014 NRL Grand Final. Canterbury reached the grand final after winning three sudden death finals matches against Melbourne, Manly-Warringah and Penrith.

On 10 August 2017, Canterbury announced Rugby League World Cup CEO Andrew Hill as the replacement for outgoing boss Raelene Castle. On the appointment, chairman Ray Dib noted that "Andrew was appointed from a very strong list of candidates and has exceptional experience in the game of rugby league."

In September 2017, Canterbury announced that former premiership winning player Dean Pay would be the new coach at the club starting in 2018.

The 2018 NRL season started off badly for Canterbury with the club only winning 3 of its first 10 matches. In May 2018, the new Canterbury board admitted that they would not be able to make any major signings until the end of the 2021 season due to the salary cap drama engulfing the club. The issue with the salary cap problems involved the previous administration and former coach Des Hasler who signed numerous players on back ended deals. In the wake of the scandal, the club was forced to offload players to free up room in the cap. This resulted in Moses Mbye departing for the Wests Tigers and star recruit Aaron Woods being sold to Cronulla after only signing with Canterbury months prior. On 16 June 2018, Canterbury suffered a humiliating 32-10 loss to the Gold Coast Titans at Belmore, in the press conference coach Dean Pay said "Physically, we just weren't good enough. The way they turned up, the way they trained during the week wasn't good enough, I feel sorry for the fans".
On 20 July 2018, Canterbury played against arch rivals Parramatta in what the media had dubbed as the "Spoon Bowl" with both sides sitting at the bottom of the ladder. There were fears before the game that the match would attract the lowest NRL crowd in over 20 years. Parramatta went on to win the match 14-8.
After the defeat by Parramatta, Canterbury were facing the prospect of finishing with the wooden spoon for the first time since 2008 but over the coming four weeks the club managed to pull off upset wins against the Wests Tigers, the Brisbane Broncos and St. George to finish the season in 12th place. The lower grades of Canterbury performed better in 2018 with the club winning the Intrust Super Premiership defeating Newtown 18-12 in the final and also winning the NRL State Championship defeating Redcliffe 42-18.

Canterbury started off the 2019 NRL season losing their two first games in convincing fashion against the New Zealand Warriors and rivals Parramatta. Due to the bad start to the season, there were rumours that coach Dean Pay would be relieved of his duties but he was then granted a 12-month contract extension to remain as Canterbury coach until the end of 2020.

By the midway part of the 2019 season, Canterbury-Bankstown found themselves sitting last on the table and in real danger of finishing with the wooden spoon. However, for the third straight season, Canterbury achieved four upset victories in a row over Penrith, the Wests Tigers, South Sydney and Parramatta who were all competing for a place in the finals series and were higher on the table. Pay was credited with the late season revival as the side focused heavily on defence.

In the 2020 NRL season, Canterbury-Bankstown were defeated in both of their opening fixtures. The season was then temporarily postponed. Following the season resumption, they were defeated by Manly-Warringah at Central Coast Stadium. They then defeated the St George Illawarra Dragons 22-2 at Bankwest Stadium. After round 9, they have not won a game. They were defeated in round 9 by the Brisbane Broncos at Suncrop Stadium 26-8. The speculation that then Head Coach Dean Pay would be sacked grew. By Tuesday 14 July 2020, Canterbury-Bankstown released a statement saying that Pay had resigned from his position. In this statement, the club announced that Pay's assistant coach Steve Georgallis would take over the role. Following this, it was reported that Dean's other assistant, Steve Antonelli, also resigned from his position. The clubs Canterbury Cup NSW head coach Brad Henderson would fill in as Georgallis's assistant coach.

On Wednesday 22 July 2020, the club announced that they had secured the services of former Manly Warringah Sea Eagles head coach and current (at 22 July 2020) Penrith Panthers assistant coach, Trent Barrett to coach the club from the start of season 2021 on a three-year deal.

Canterbury finished the 2020 NRL season in 15th place on the table after a horror year on and off the field.  Canterbury finished on equal points with Brisbane but avoided the wooden spoon due to a slightly better for and against record.

Canterbury started the 2021 NRL season poorly losing their opening three matches including being kept scoreless in round 2 & round 3 against Penrith and Brisbane respectively.  This was the first time in the club's history that this had occurred.
In round 4 of the 2021 NRL season, Canterbury were defeated 38-0 by South Sydney in the traditional Good Friday game.  Canterbury became only the second team in the NRL era to lose three straight games without scoring a point after Cronulla who achieved this in the 2014 NRL season.

It was also the worst start to a season by any team since Glebe in the 1928 NSWRFL season who managed to only score 12 points in their first four matches.
On 30 June 2021, Canterbury were fined $50,000 by the NRL after failing to communicate the increased Covid restrictions to players.  The incident was in relation to five Canterbury players visiting Sydney's Eastern Suburbs which was a Covid-19 hotspot.

In round 16 of the 2021 NRL season, Canterbury suffered their third heaviest defeat in club history losing 66-0 to Manly-Warringah at WEstern Sydney Stadium.

In round 22 of the 2021 NRL season, Canterbury were handed their sixth Wooden Spoon after losing 24-10 against the New Zealand Warriors.  Canterbury needed to win the match and their remaining three fixtures to avoid finishing last.

Despite a number of off-season recruits, Canterbury started the 2022 NRL season poorly winning only two of their first ten matches.  On 16 May 2022, Canterbury head coach Trent Barrett resigned from his position with the club sitting bottom of the table.
On 18 May 2022, Michael Potter was named as interim coach of the Canterbury-Bankstown Bulldogs after the resignation of Barrett. Under Potter, the club won five of their last 14 matches to avoid the wooden spoon by finishing 12th.

Name and emblem
The name and emblem of the club has changed several times over its history. At the club's foundation in 1935, it was known only as 'Canterbury-Bankstown', without an animal mascot. The nicknames 'Berries' and 'C-Bs' (or, derisively, 'Country Bumpkins') were often used informally, 'C-Bs' being used from the outset and 'Berries' coming into use by the mid-1940s. The club had been referred to as the 'Bulldogs' as early as 1977. In 1978, the Bulldog mascot and name was adopted, with the club becoming known as the 'Canterbury-Bankstown Bulldogs'. This was the name used throughout the team's 1980s glory era. In 1995 the club name was changed to 'Sydney Bulldogs', reflecting a similar change by Eastern Suburbs (to 'Sydney City Roosters'). The name changed again in 1996, returning to 'Canterbury Bulldogs' with 'Bankstown' omitted, and yet again in 2000, to the geographically indistinct 'Bulldogs'. Bob Hagan, the club boss at the time of the 2000 change, explained that the dropping of the name 'Canterbury' was intended to broaden the appeal of the club outside of its traditional supporter base, so that the club could attract a geographically diverse following like Manchester United or the Chicago Bulls. Despite the name change, some supporters, as well as many television and radio commentators, continued to refer to the club as 'Canterbury'. In the most recent change, board officials voted in late 2009 for the club to return to 'Canterbury-Bankstown Bulldogs' from the 2010 season onwards.

The initial crest was a 'C-B' in a shield. The adoption of the 'Bulldogs' name and mascot took place in 1978. There have been three main versions of the mascot logo. The first, which featured a snarling bulldog inside a circle, was replaced in 1998 by a more 'cartoonish' logo of a bulldog's head. In 2009, the club announced that the logo would be changing again, and asked members to vote on which of two similar proposed logos would be used from 2010. The rationale for the logo change was to celebrate the club's 75th anniversary in 2010 and to better reflect the club's "true essence and history". Two months later, the new design was unveiled, with the official change of logo taking place in November 2009. The current logo returns to the standing bulldog of the 1978–1997 logo, although it is no longer snarling. It also references elements of the club's history by incorporating the 'C-B' emblem, the club's year of foundation (1935), and the blue and white 'V' design which has featured on many of the club's jerseys over the years. The change of name from 'Bulldogs' to 'Canterbury-Bankstown Bulldogs' took place after the new logo was unveiled.

Colours
The Bulldogs have played in predominantly blue and white strip since the club entered the league in 1935. The only exception to this was during the Second World War, when rationing meant they had to wear a maroon jersey with a blue 'V'.

There have been four basic strip designs since the club's inception in the top-flight league competition:
 The irregular ("butcher stripes") stripes design – used from 1935 until 1962. This design had blue and white irregular stripes worn with black shorts. The irregular strip has been used recently in occasional 'heritage' matches (e.g. Heritage round in 2008 vs St. George Illawarra)
 Maroon with Blue V - used from 1943 until 1945 during the war. Due to the war effort, dye was in limited supply. Teams were asked to avoid stripes to conserve dye. This jersey design has been seen as 'unlucky' by fans.
 The 'V Strip' – used between 1963 and 1969, and revived in 1973. White shirt with blue V, blue shorts. The current "away" strip has blue shorts, but features a blue shirt with white V.
 Blue & White hoops - From 1970 to 1972, the club adopted a jersey featuring blue and white hoops. This reverted to the 'V Strip' from 1973 onwards.

Stadium

In their inaugural season, very few home matches were allocated to the Canterbury-Bankstown club. However, when the opportunity arose the club took their matches to either Marrickville or Pratten Park. From the following season, the club began to base itself at Belmore Sports Ground. The club had a long-time affinity with the ground and stayed there continuously until 1994.

In 1995 when the Super League War began to come about, the club changed its playing name to the "Sydney Bulldogs" in an attempt to broaden its fan base and played matches at Parramatta Stadium where spectator facilities were of a higher class. This move paid off with the club going on to become premiers that season. However, the club reverted its name to Canterbury for the 1996 season and once again played matches out of Belmore Sports Ground; something that lasted up until the inaugural National Rugby League season of 1998.

Once the new Stadium Australia had been finished and opened in preparation for the Sydney 2000 Olympic Games, the club began to play matches there between 1999 and 2000. From 2001 to 2005, the club then began to play matches out of the new Sydney Showground at Homebush Bay, with bigger matches played out of the then-Telstra Stadium from 2003. When fans began to complain about the poor quality of the Showground venue as a rugby league ground, the club eventually decided to move all future home matches to the Stadium, where the club remains. In 2008, Telstra Stadium became known as ANZ Stadium due to a naming rights change.

The club's training and administration offices remained at Belmore Sports Ground until the beginning of 2008, but were relocated to Sydney Olympic Park during the 2008 season. With the NSW Government committing to upgrading Belmore Sports Ground, the club administration and training has now been returned to the historical ground after a $9 million upgrade.

In 2015, the club played two home games at their traditional home ground Belmore Sports Ground as part of the club's 80th-anniversary celebrations. They have continued to play some games at Belmore every year since 2015. From 2019, the club started to schedule only one home fixture at Belmore Sports Ground. No game was held at Belmore in the 2020 season due to the COVID-19 season postponement and season rescheduling.

Supporters

The Bulldogs Army is the core supporter group for the Bulldogs, with the section they sit within known as 'The Kennel'. To be sitting in this section, supporters must become a member of the club itself and register any large flags and/or banners which are brought to the game. At all away games the Bulldogs Army locates themselves in the general admission section. The main aim of the Bulldogs Army is to show support and passion for the Bulldogs.

As the region's traditional local representatives, the Bulldogs predominantly draw on a support base in and around the districts of Canterbury and Bankstown in south-western Sydney, although in recent years club administration and home matches have relocated to Sydney Olympic Park. The Bulldogs are the most supported NRL club in regional NSW—over 25% of Bulldog fans are located in regional NSW, over 25% are located outside of NSW and over 10% are located in Queensland. The club has one of the highest average attendances in the league: over the 2010 season, it was one of only two clubs to record an average home crowd of more than 20,000.

The multicultural demographics of the suburbs in the club's support base, such as Lakemba, means the club has a large number of supporters from a range of non-Anglo ethnicities. In recent years the club has become particularly identified in the media with the Lebanese and the Greek community, particularly with the club's former star goalkicker Hazem El Masri, who migrated from Lebanon as a young child. The Greek community has a huge history of Greeks playing for the club dating back to the 1970s with club legend Dr George Peponis, who migrated from Greece as a very young child who captained the Bulldogs and Australia. El Masri retired at the end of the 2009 season.

Notable supporters

Rivalries

Parramatta Eels
The rivalry between the Canterbury-Bankstown Bulldogs and the Parramatta Eels is one of the fiercest in the NRL. The two clubs have been geographically close throughout their whole histories. In the 1980s, Canterbury and Parramatta both won four premierships each and met in two grand finals in 1984 and 1986.

In the 1990s, at the height of the super league war, Parramatta signed four of Canterbury's star players Jarrod McCracken, Dean Pay, Jim Dymock and Jason Smith which helped Parramatta reach the finals for the first time in eleven years, in the 1998 preliminary final, Parramatta were winning against Canterbury 18-2 with less than ten minutes to play when Canterbury staged one of the biggest comebacks finals comebacks defeating Parramatta 32-20 in extra time.

In the 2007 NRL season, the club's played each other in the elimination final at Telstra Stadium with Parramatta gaining revenge for the 1998 preliminary final as they defeated Canterbury 25-6.

In the 2009 NRL season, Parramatta defeated Canterbury in the preliminary final to cap off a remarkable run to the grand final. The crowd which attended the match was a non grand final record of 74,000 fans.

Speaking to the Herald Sun in 2007, former Canterbury-Bankstown player Craig Polla-Mounter described the rivalry between the two club's saying "I think the Parramatta and Canterbury fans can be the most unforgiving, especially when we play each other. I have no doubt it is the biggest rivalry in rugby league and part of the reason he didn't play again".  Polla-Mounter said this in reference to Parramatta player Paul Carige and his infamous performance in the 1998 preliminary final.

Speaking of the rivalry in 2015, former Canterbury player James Graham said "As soon as I came to this club, I was told that they were the closest club to us and that there was no love lost between players and fans". Andrew Ryan who played for both clubs said "Both clubs do speak about the rivalry, in the change room and leading into the clashes, they always want to get the wood on their rival, I went for Canterbury when I was a kid, but then got my first opportunity in first grade to play for Parramatta. They place a huge amount of emphasis on the game. I think I was one of the only players to go the other way, a lot of players who had played for the Bulldogs allayed first the Eels, not too many went the other way".

Sydney Roosters
The Canterbury-Bankstown Bulldogs have a long-standing rivalry with fellow team the Sydney Roosters, Whilst both teams had crossed premiership paths in grand finals in four occasions. In 1938, Canterbury-Bankstown won their first premiership against the Eastern Suburbs as what they were known as back then winning 19-6 at the Sydney Cricket Ground. Two years later in 1940, the sides met again with the Easts winning the 1940 NSWRFL Grand Final 24-14. In 1980, the Canterbury-Bankstown Bulldogs broke a 38-year premiership drought defeating the Eastern Suburbs Roosters 18-4 at the Sydney Cricket Ground.

In 2002, the Sydney Roosters won the NRL premiership on the back of a 9-game winning streak. This was the same year the premiership favourite Canterbury were stripped of 37 points due to systematic breaches of the salary cap in 2001 and 2002, in 2003, the Roosters proved themselves worthy of defending premiers title when they defeated Canterbury in the preliminary final 28-18 in front of a sold out Aussie Stadium. In 2004, the Roosters defeated Canterbury 35-0 and fighting broke out in the stands during and after the game had been completed. While the Roosters finished the regular season with the minor premiership, Canterbury defeated them in the grand final 16-13 after trailing 13-6 at half time.

As of the 2021 NRL season, the last time the two clubs met in a finals game was the 2015 Elimination Final which the Roosters won 38-12 at the Sydney Football Stadium.

St. George Illawarra Dragons
The Canterbury-Bankstown Bulldogs have a fierce rivalry with their neighbour the St. George Illawarra Dragons. Canterbury-Bankstown were founded in 1935, fourteen years after St. George Dragons, St. George inflicted a premiership record 91-6 victory over Canterbury in 1935 but Canterbury enjoyed premiership success first in 1938 and St. George in 1942. In the 1942 NSWRFL season, the two clubs met in the Grand Final with Canterbury-Bankstown defeating St. George 11-9 in a low-scoring affair at the Sydney Cricket Ground. After that however, St. George recorded eleven straight premierships in the years following 1955-1966. It was also Canterbury who put an end to their Premiership run in 1967, when they beat them by a point in the preliminary final to face South Sydney in the grand final. Since then, both clubs inflicted Premiership defeats on the other, with the St. George Dragons defeating the Canterbury-Bankstown Bulldogs in their last grand final success in 1979, the Bulldogs returned the favour in 1985.

The two teams subsequently met in the 1993 preliminary final which St. George defeated Canterbury 27-12. They would meet again in the 1995 and 1998 finals series with Canterbury running out winners on both occasions. The elimination final in 1998 was also St. George's last game as a stand-alone entity as the club elected to form a joint venture with Illawarra for the 1999 NRL season.
Biggest loss 6-91 (85 pts) - May 11, 1935 - vs. St George

South Sydney Rabbitohs

Souths and Canterbury-Bankstown have played each other every Good Friday since 2012. They met in the 1967 NSWRFL Grand Final with South Sydney winning 12-10. However, the competitive nature intensified when they met in the 2014 NRL Grand Final where Souths won 30-6 to claim their first premiership since 1971.

During their Good Friday clash in 2015, this game was labelled for its controversy, as South Sydney won 18-17 thanks to a late penalty goal. Canterbury fans were angry about the match officials decision and attacked the match officials when they walked off the field, throwing bottles at them, even causing one of them to slip over. Some fans were given lifetime bans for throwing bottles at the match officials.

In round 4 of the 2021 NRL season, Canterbury were defeated 38-0 by South Sydney in the traditional Good Friday game.  Canterbury became only the second team in the NRL era to lose three straight games without scoring a point after Cronulla who achieved this in the 2014 NRL season.

It was also the worst start to a season by any team since Glebe in the 1928 NSWRFL season who managed to only score 12 points in their first four matches.

Canterbury League Club
The Canterbury League Club is the licensed club of the Canterbury-Bankstown Bulldogs. Canterbury League Club first opened its doors for trade in September 1956 to service the needs of the football club and local community. The Salvation Army Hall became the first venue of the Canterbury League Club. Sixty people would fill the venue on a busy night.

In the first two years of trade the club was outgrowing itself and in 1960 the Club moved its premises to Bridge St which allowed the League Club to grow as well as cater for patron parking.

During the 1990s Canterbury managed one of the most successful league clubs in NSW and was quickly becoming known as one of the most progressive leisure facilities in Australia. With trade booming and patronage at an all-time high, the Club extended its trading to 24-hour trading.

In 2000, the Board had approved major renovations. The renovations started in 2000 and in 2002 the Banyan Brasserie, Dynasty Restaurant, new foyer, level 1 and health club were opened to the public.

The club also amalgamated with Lakemba Services Memorial Club (2008) & Belfield RSL (2013).

Canterbury League Club has since become one of Sydney's premier hospitality destinations with 5-star amenities including three restaurants, two coffee shops, multiple bars and entertainment lounges and a 24-hour health club.

Statistics and records

Hazem El Masri holds the NRL record for the most games played for the club, having made 317 appearances in total.

Hazem El Masri also holds records for the most points scored, the most tries scored and the most points scored for the Bulldogs. Since his debut in 1996, he has scored a total of 2,418 points—which was also a competition record for Rugby League in Australia until 2019. Former player Daryl Halligan, who retired with the club in 2000, had previously held the competition record for most points scored with 2,034, which included points scored whilst at his former club the North Sydney Bears.

The club's largest win occurred in 1995 when they played as the "Sydney Bulldogs." In a match against the newly formed North Queensland Cowboys, the Bulldogs won 66-4. In the club's first season in 1935 they were subject to the two heaviest defeats in competition history two weeks in succession. Firstly, they lost to St. George 91-6 and the following week to Eastern Suburbs 87-7. However, despite these big losses, the club was able to secure their first premiership 3 years later in 1938 in the Grand Final against Eastern Suburbs; at the same time setting the record for becoming the quickest non-foundation club to win a title. This record was not broken until 1999.

In 2002, the club won 17 matches in a row after getting beaten by New Zealand Warriors; falling just two short of the record set by the Eastern Suburbs team of 1975.

In Round 7 of the 2014 season, after beating the South Sydney Rabbitohs 15-14, the Bulldogs became the first club to win three consecutive matches by 1 point. They went on to be runners up to South Sydney Rabbitohs in the grandfinal.

In April 2015, the Bulldogs played the Rabbitohs at ANZ Stadium in front of 40,523 spectators.

Season summaries

|+ P=Premiers, R=Runner-Ups, M=Minor Premierships, F=Finals Appearance, W=Wooden Spoons  (brackets represent finals games)
|-
! Competition !! GamesPlayed !! GamesWon !! GamesDrawn !! GamesLost !! LadderPosition !! style="width:2%;"|P !! style="width:2%;"|R !! style="width:2%;"|M !! style="width:2%;"|F !! style="width:2%;"|W !! Coach!! style="width:16%;"|Captain!! Details
|- style="background-color: #EAEAEA"
| 1935 NSWRFL season || 16 || 2 || 0 || 14 || 8 / 9 || || || || || || Tedda Courtney || Jack Morrison / Tom Carey  || Canterbury-Bankstown 1935
|-
| 1936 NSWRFL season || 14 (1) || 9 || 2 || 3 (1) || 3 / 9 || || || ||   || || Frank Burge || rowspan="4" | Alan Brady || Canterbury-Bankstown 1936 
|- style="background-color: #EAEAEA"
| 1937 NSWRFL season || 8 || 4 || 0 || 4 || 5 / 9 || || || || || || George Mason || Canterbury-Bankstown 1937 
|-
| 1938 NSWRFL season || 14 (2) || 12 (2) || 2 || 1 || 1 / 8 ||  || ||  ||  || || Jimmy Craig || Canterbury-Bankstown 1938 
|- style="background-color: #EAEAEA"
| 1939 NSWRFL season || 14 (1) || 10 || 0 || 4 || 3 / 8 || || || ||  || || Jerry Brien || Canterbury-Bankstown 1939 
|-
| 1940 NSWRFL season || 14 (2) || 8 (1) || 0 || 6 (1) || 4 / 8 || ||  || ||  || || Alan Brady  || Alan Brady / Jack Bonnyman  || Canterbury-Bankstown 1940 
|- style="background-color: #EAEAEA"
| 1941 NSWRFL season || 14 (1) || 9 || 0 || 5 (1) || 3 / 8 || || ||||  || || Ron Bailey || rowspan="2"| Ron Bailey || Canterbury-Bankstown 1941 
|-
| 1942 NSWRFL season || 14 (2) || 10 (1) || 0 || 4 (1) || 1 / 8 ||   || ||  ||  || ||Jerry Brien || Canterbury-Bankstown 1942 
|- style="background-color: #EAEAEA"
| 1943 NSWRFL season || 14 || 3 || 0 || 11 || 8 / 8 || || || || ||  || Roy Kirkaldy || Roy Kirkaldy || Canterbury-Bankstown 1943 
|-
| 1944 NSWRFL season || 14 || 3 || 1 || 10 || 8 / 8 || || || || ||   ||  Ron Bailey/ Cec Fifield || Ron Bailey || Canterbury-Bankstown 1944 
|- style="background-color: #EAEAEA"
| 1945 NSWRFL season || 14 || 4 || 1 || 9 || 6 / 8 || || || || || || Bill Kelly  || George Kilham  || Canterbury-Bankstown 1945 
|-
| 1946 NSWRFL season || 14 (2) || 8 (1) || 1 || 5 (1) || 4 / 8 || || || || || ||  rowspan="2"| Ross McKinnon || Ron Bailey || Canterbury-Bankstown 1946 
|- style="background-color: #EAEAEA"
| 1947 NSWRFL season || 18 (3) || 13 (1) || 1 || 4 (2) || 1 / 10 || ||  ||  ||  || || rowspan="2"  | Henry Porter || Canterbury-Bankstown 1947 
|-
| 1948 NSWRFL season || 18 || 7 || 2 || 9 || 5 / 10 || || || || || || Arthur Halloway  || Canterbury-Bankstown 1948 
|- style="background-color: #EAEAEA"
| 1949 NSWRFL season || 18 || 6 || 2 || 10 || 7 / 10 || || || || || || Henry Porter  || Bruce Hopkins  || Canterbury-Bankstown 1949 
|-
| 1950 NSWRFL season || 18|| 9 || 0 || 9 || 6 / 10 || || || || || || Alby Why  || Eddie Burns ||  Canterbury-Bankstown 1950 
|- style="background-color: #EAEAEA"
| 1951 NSWRFL season || 18 || 7 || 0 || 11 || 7 / 10 || || || || || ||  Vic Bulgin / Alby Why  ||  Vic Bulgin || Canterbury-Bankstown 1951 
|-
| 1952 NSWRFL season || 18 || 5 || 1 || 12 || 9 / 10 || || || || || || Alby Why || Ken Charlton || Canterbury-Bankstown 1952 
|- style="background-color: #EAEAEA"
| 1953 NSWRFL season || 18 || 9 || 2|| 7 || 6 / 10 || || || || || || rowspan="2" |  Jack Hampstead  || Cec Cooper  || Canterbury-Bankstown 1953 
|-
| 1954 NSWRFL season || 18 || 4 || 0 || 14 || 8 / 10 || || || || || || Leo Trevena || Canterbury-Bankstown 1954 
|- style="background-color: #EAEAEA"
| 1955 NSWRFL season || 18 || 4 || 0 || 14 || 9 / 10 || || || || || || rowspan="2" |  Vic Hey  || Ray Gartner  || Canterbury-Bankstown 1955 
|-
| 1956 NSWRFL season || 18 || 6 || 0 || 12 || 7 / 10 || || || || || ||  rowspan="2"| Col Geelan || Canterbury-Bankstown 1956 
|- style="background-color: #EAEAEA"
| 1957 NSWRFL season || 18 || 3 || 1 || 14 || 9 / 10 || || || || || || Col Geelan  || Canterbury-Bankstown 1957 
|-
| 1958 NSWRFL season || 18 || 4 || 1 || 13 || 9 / 10 || || || || || || rowspan="2" |  Cec Cooper  || Ray Gartner  || Canterbury-Bankstown 1958 
|- style="background-color: #EAEAEA"
| 1959 NSWRFL season || 18 || 5 || 1 || 12 || 9 / 10 || || || || || || rowspan="2" | Brian Davies || Canterbury-Bankstown 1959 
|-
| 1960 NSWRFL season || 18 (2) || 11 (0) || 0 || 7 (2) || 5 / 10 || || || ||  || || rowspan="3" | Eddie Burns || Canterbury-Bankstown 1960 
|- style="background-color: #EAEAEA"
| 1961 NSWRFL season || 18 || 6 || 1 || 11 || 8 / 10 || || || || || || Ray Gartner  || Canterbury-Bankstown 1961 
|-
| 1962 NSWRFL season || 18 || 7 || 2 || 9 || 6 / 10 || || || || || || Ray Beavan / Brian Davies  || Canterbury-Bankstown 1962 
|- style="background-color: #EAEAEA"
| 1963 NSWRFL season || 18 || 6 || 1 || 11 || 8 / 10 || || || || || || rowspan="2" |  Clive Churchill  || Ray Gartner  || Canterbury-Bankstown 1963 
|-
| 1964 NSWRFL season || 18 || 1 || 1 || 16 || 10 / 10 || || || || ||   ||  Les Johns || Canterbury-Bankstown 1964 
|- style="background-color: #EAEAEA"
| 1965 NSWRFL season || 18 || 5 || 0 || 13 || 9 / 10 || || || || || || Eddie Burns || Leo Toohey  || Canterbury-Bankstown 1965 
|-
| 1966 NSWRFL season || 18 || 8 || 0 || 10 || 8 / 10 || || || || || || Roger Pearman  || Roger Pearman / George Taylforth  || Canterbury-Bankstown 1966 
|- style="background-color: #EAEAEA"
| 1967 NSWRFL season || 22 (3) || 14 (2) || 1 || 7 (1) || 3 / 12 || ||   || ||   || ||  rowspan="4" | Kevin Ryan ||  rowspan="3" | Kevin Ryan  || Canterbury-Bankstown 1967 
|-
| 1968 NSWRFL season || 22 || 9 || 1 || 12 || 9 / 12 || || || || || || Canterbury-Bankstown 1968 
|- style="background-color: #EAEAEA"
| 1969 NSWRFL season || 22 || 10 || 0 || 12 || 8 / 12 || || || || || || Canterbury-Bankstown 1969 
|-
| 1970 NSWRFL season || 22 (1) || 14 (0) || 0 || 8 (1) || 4 / 12 || || || ||   || ||  Ron Raper  || Canterbury-Bankstown 1970 
|- style="background-color: #EAEAEA"
| 1971 NSWRFL season || 22 || 11 || 0 || 11 || 6 / 12 || || || || || || rowspan="2" |  Bob Hagan || rowspan="2" |  Johnny Greaves  ||  Canterbury-Bankstown 1971 
|-
| 1972 NSWRFL season || 22 || 12 || 0 || 10 || 6 / 12 || || || || || ||  Canterbury-Bankstown 1972 
|- style="background-color: #EAEAEA"
| 1973 NSWRFL season || 22 (1) || 12 (0) || 1 || 10 (1) || 5 / 12 || || || ||   || || rowspan="5" |  Malcolm Clift  || Geoff Conell  ||  Canterbury-Bankstown 1973 
|-
| 1974 NSWRFL season || 22 (3) || 13 (2) || 0 || 9 (1) || 3 / 12 || ||   || ||   || ||  John McDonell  ||  Canterbury-Bankstown Bulldogs 1974 
|- style="background-color: #EAEAEA"
| 1975 NSWRFL season || 22 (1) || 11 (0) || 0 || 9 (1) || 4 / 12 || || || ||   || || Tim Pickup  || Canterbury-Bankstown Bulldogs 1975 
|-
| 1976 NSWRFL season || 22 (3) || 12 (2) || 3 || 7 (1) || 5 / 12 || || || ||   || ||   rowspan="2" |  Bob McCarthy  || Canterbury-Bankstown Bulldogs 1976 
|- style="background-color: #EAEAEA"
| 1977 NSWRFL season || 22 || 10 || 1 || 11 || 7 / 12 || || || || || || Canterbury-Bankstown Bulldogs 1977 
|-
| 1978 NSWRFL season || 22 (1) || 13 (0) || 2 || 7 (1) || 5 / 12 || || || ||  || || rowspan="6" |  Ted Glossop ||  rowspan="5" |  George Peponis  || Canterbury-Bankstown Bulldogs 1978 
|- style="background-color: #EAEAEA"
| 1979 NSWRFL season || 22 (4) || 13 (3) || 0 || 9 (1) || 5 / 12 || ||  || ||  || || Canterbury-Bankstown Bulldogs 1979 
|-
| 1980 NSWRFL season || 22 (3) || 15 (3) || 0 || 7 (0) || 2 / 12 ||  || || ||  || || Canterbury-Bankstown Bulldogs 1980 
|- style="background-color: #EAEAEA"
| 1981 NSWRFL season || 22 || 8 || 0 || 14 || 10 / 12 || || || || || || Canterbury-Bankstown Bulldogs 1981 
|-
| 1982 NSWRFL season || 26 || 12 || 3 || 11 || 9 / 14 || || || || || || Canterbury-Bankstown Bulldogs 1982 
|- style="background-color: #EAEAEA"
| 1983 NSWRFL season || 26 (3) || 18 (1) || 0 || 8 (2) || 3 / 14 || || || ||  || || Chris Anderson  || Canterbury-Bankstown Bulldogs 1983 
|-
| 1984 NSWRL season || 24 (2) || 19 (2) || 0 || 5 (0) || 1 / 13 ||  || ||  ||  || || rowspan="4" | Warren Ryan ||   rowspan="4" | Steve Mortimer  || Canterbury-Bankstown Bulldogs 1984 
|- style="background-color: #EAEAEA"
| 1985 NSWRL season || 24 (4) || 16 (3) || 2 || 6 (1) || 3 / 13 ||  || || ||  || || Canterbury-Bankstown Bulldogs 1985 
|-
| 1986 NSWRL season || 24 (4) || 15 (2) || 1 || 8 (2) || 3 / 13 || ||  || ||  || || Canterbury-Bankstown Bulldogs 1986 
|- style="background-color: #EAEAEA"
| 1987 NSWRL season || 24 || 13 || 0 || 11 || 6 / 13 || || || || || || Canterbury-Bankstown Bulldogs 1987 
|-
| 1988 NSWRL season || 22 (3) || 16 (3) || 0 || 6 (0) || 2 / 16 ||   || || ||  || ||rowspan="2" |  Phil Gould  ||  rowspan="2" |  Peter Tunks  || Canterbury-Bankstown Bulldogs 1988 
|- style="background-color: #EAEAEA"
| 1989 NSWRL season || 22 || 10 || 2 || 10 || 9 / 16 || || || || || || Canterbury-Bankstown Bulldogs 1989 
|-
| 1990 NSWRL season || 22 || 12 || 1 || 9 || 7 / 16 || || || || || || rowspan="8" |  Chris Anderson ||  rowspan="6" |  Terry Lamb  || Canterbury-Bankstown Bulldogs 1990 
|- style="background-color: #EAEAEA"
| 1991 NSWRL season || 22 (1) || 13 (0) || 1 || 8 (1) || 5 / 16 || || || ||   || ||  Canterbury-Bankstown Bulldogs 1991 
|-
| 1992 NSWRL season || 22 || 10 || 2 || 10 || 7 / 16 || || || || || ||  Canterbury-Bankstown Bulldogs 1992 
|- style="background-color: #EAEAEA"
| 1993 NSWRL season || 22 (2) || 17 (0) || 0 || 5 (2) || 1 / 16 || || ||  ||   || || Canterbury-Bankstown Bulldogs 1993 
|-
| 1994 NSWRL season || 22 (2) || 18 (1) || 0 || 4 (1) || 1 / 16 || ||  ||   ||   || ||  Canterbury-Bankstown Bulldogs 1994 
|- style="background-color: #EAEAEA"
| 1995 ARL season || 22 (4) || 14 (4) || 0 || 8 (0) || 6 / 20 ||   || || ||  || || Sydney Bulldogs 1995 
|-
| 1996 ARL season || 21 || 11 || 0 || 10 || 10 / 20 || || || || || ||  rowspan="2" |  Simon Gillies  || Sydney Bulldogs 1996 
|- style="background-color: #EAEAEA"
| 1997 SL season || 18 (1) || 10 (0) || 0 || 8 (1) || 4 / 10 || || || ||   || ||  Canterbury Bulldogs 1997 
|-
| 1998 NRL season || 24 (5) || 13 (4) || 0 || 11 (1) || 9 / 20 || ||   || ||   || || rowspan="11" |  Steve Folkes  || rowspan="4"  | Darren Britt  || Canterbury Bulldogs 1998 
|- style="background-color: #EAEAEA"
| 1999 NRL season || 24 (2) || 15 (1) || 1 || 8 (1) || 5 / 17 || || || ||   || ||  Canterbury Bulldogs 1999 
|-
| 2000 NRL season || 26 || 10 || 1 || 15 || 11 / 14 || || || || || ||  Bulldogs 2000 
|- style="background-color: #EAEAEA"
| 2001 NRL season || 26 (2) || 17 (0) || 3 || 6 (2) || 2 / 14 || || || ||   || ||  Bulldogs 2001 
|-
| 2002 NRL season || 24 || 20 || 1 || 3 || 15 / 15 || || || || ||   ||  rowspan="3" |  Steven Price  || Bulldogs 2002 
|- style="background-color: #EAEAEA"
| 2003 NRL season || 24 || 16 (1) || 0 || 8 (2) || 3 / 15 || || || ||   || || style="text-align: center;" |   Bulldogs 2003 
|-
| 2004 NRL season || 24 (4) || 19 (3) || 0 || 5 (1) || 2 / 15 ||   || || || style="text-align: center;" |  || ||  Bulldogs 2004 
|- style="background-color: #EAEAEA"
| 2005 NRL season || 24 || 9 || 1 || 14 || 12 / 15 || || || || || ||   rowspan="7" |  Andrew Ryan  || Bulldogs 2005 
|-
| 2006 NRL season || 24 (2) || 16 (1) || 0 || 8 (1) || 2 / 15 || || || ||  || || Bulldogs 2006 
|- style="background-color: #EAEAEA"
| 2007 NRL season || 24 (2) || 12 (0) || 0 || 12 (2) || 6 / 16 || || || ||   || || Bulldogs 2007
|-
|  2008 NRL season || 24 || 5 || 0 || 19 || 16 / 16 || || || || ||  || Bulldogs 2008
|- style="background-color: #EAEAEA"
| 2009 NRL season || 24 (2) || 18 (1) || 0 || 6 (1) || 2 / 16 || || || ||   || || rowspan="2" |  Kevin Moore  || Bulldogs 2009
|-
| 2010 NRL season || 24 || 9 || 0 || 15 || 13 / 16 || || || || || || Canterbury-Bankstown Bulldogs 2010
|- style="background-color: #EAEAEA"
| 2011 NRL season || 24 || 12 || 0 || 12 || 9 / 16 || || || || || || Kevin Moore/ Jim Dymock ||  Canterbury-Bankstown Bulldogs 2011
|-
| 2012 NRL season || 24 (3) || 18 (2) || 0 || 6 (1) || 1 / 16 || ||   ||   ||   || ||  rowspan="6" | Des Hasler  || rowspan="2" |  Michael Ennis  || Canterbury-Bankstown Bulldogs 2012
|- style="background-color: #EAEAEA"
| 2013 NRL season || 24 (1) || 13 (0) || 0 || 11 (1) || 6 / 16 || || || ||  || || Canterbury-Bankstown Bulldogs 2013
|-
| 2014 NRL season || 24 (4) || 13 (3) || 0 || 11 (1) || 7 / 16 || ||   || ||  || || Michael Ennis and Frank Pritchard  || Canterbury-Bankstown Bulldogs 2014
|- style="background-color: #EAEAEA"
| 2015 NRL season || 24 (2) || 14 (1) || 0 || 10 (1) || 5 / 16 || || || ||   || ||  rowspan="3" | James Graham || Canterbury-Bankstown Bulldogs 2015
|-
| 2016 NRL season || 24 (1) || 14 (0) || 0 || 10 (1) || 7 / 16 || || || ||   || || Canterbury-Bankstown Bulldogs 2016
|- style="background-color: #EAEAEA"
| 2017 NRL season || 24 || 10 || 0 || 14 || 11 / 16 || || || || || || Canterbury-Bankstown Bulldogs 2017
|-
| 2018 NRL season || 24 || 8 || 0 || 16 || 12 / 16 || || || || || ||  rowspan="2" |  Dean Pay  || rowspan="5" |  Josh Jackson || Canterbury-Bankstown Bulldogs 2018
|- style="background-color: #EAEAEA"
| 2019 NRL season || 24 || 10 || 0 || 14 || 12 / 16 || || || || || || Canterbury-Bankstown Bulldogs 2019
|-
| 2020 NRL season || 20 || 3 || 0 || 17 || 15 / 16 || || || || || || Dean Pay / Steve Georgallis || Canterbury-Bankstown Bulldogs 2020
|- style="background-color: #EAEAEA"
| 2021 NRL season || 24 || 3 || 0 || 21 || 16 / 16 || || || || ||   || Trent Barrett || Canterbury-Bankstown Bulldogs 2021
|-
| 2022 NRL season || 24 || 7 || 0 || 17 || 12 / 16 || || || || || || Trent Barrett / Michael Potter || Canterbury-Bankstown Bulldogs 2022
|- style="background-color: #EAEAEA"
| 2023 NRL season || 2 || 1 || 0 || 1 || TBA / 17 || || || || || || Cameron Ciraldo || Raymond Faitala-Mariner    Matt Burton and  Reed Mahoney   || Canterbury-Bankstown Bulldogs 2023
|}

Players

2023 Squad

Hall of Fame
On 1 August 2015, the Canterbury-Bankstown Bulldogs announced the first five inductees into the Hall of Fame to celebrate their 80th anniversary.

Notable players
On 1 August 2015, the Canterbury-Bankstown Bulldogs announced a "Team of the Decade" to celebrate their 80th anniversary.

2023 Signings &  Transfers

Gains

Fa'amanu Brown - West Tigers 
Jonah Glover - Brisbane Tigers
Andrew Davey - Manly Warringah Sea Eagles
Viliame Kikau - Penrith Panthers
Reed Mahoney - Parramatta Eels
Isaac Matalavea-Booth - Gold Coast Titans
Zac Montgomery - Sydney Roosters
Karl Oloapu - Brisbane Broncos
Franklin Pele - Cronulla Sutherland Sharks
Hayze Perham - Parramatta Eels
Jacob Preston - Sydney Roosters
Josh Reynolds - Free Agent
Jordan Samrani - Cronulla Sutherland Sharks
Jack Stringer - Sydney Roosters
Ryan Sutton - Canberra Raiders
Blake Wilson - Sunshine Coast Falcons

Losses
Corey Allan - Sydney Roosters
Josh Cook - Released
Zach Dockar-Clay - North Sydney Bears
Matt Doorey - Parramatta Eels
Reece Hoffman - Released
Jack Hetherington - Newcastle Knights
Josh Jackson - Retirement
Tuipulotu Katoa - Sydney Roosters
Isaac Lumelume - Parramatta Eels
Jeremy Marshall-King - The Dolphins
Aaron Schoupp - Gold Coast Titans
Ava Seumanufagai - Leigh Centurions
Joe Stimson - Gold Coast Titans
Josh Stuckey - Manly Sea Eagles
Cooper Talau - Released
Paul Vaughan - Warrington Wolves
Brandon Wakeham - Wests Tigers

Honours

 New South Wales Rugby League, Australian Rugby League and National Rugby League premiers: 8
 1938, 1942, 1980, 1984, 1985, 1988, 1995, 2004
 New South Wales Rugby League, Australian Rugby League and National Rugby League runners-up: 10
 1940, 1947, 1967, 1974, 1979, 1986, 1994, 1998, 2012, 2014
 New South Wales Rugby League, Australian Rugby League and National Rugby League minor premierships: 7
 1938, 1942, 1947, 1984, 1993, 1994, 2012

Reserve/Pre-season Representative Honours
 New South Wales Rugby League Club Championships: 7
 1938, 1939, 1993, 1994, 2009, 2010, 2011
 Pre-Season Cup titles: 2
 1962, 1970
 Inter-City titles: 1
 1939
 NRL State Championship: 1
 2018

Junior Representative Honours:

Jersey Flegg Premiers: 1963, 1971, 1976, 1979, 1983, 1999, 2000, 2001, 2003.

SG Ball Premiers: 1972, 1978, 2009.

Harold Matthews Premiers: 2007, 2009, 2011

Canterbury-Bankstown District Juniors

Current Canterbury-Bankstown junior clubs are:

Bankstown Bulls
Bankstown Sports
Berala Bears
Chester Hill Hornets
East Hills Bulldogs
Greenacre Tigers
Milperra Colts
Moorebank Rams
Revesby Heights Rhinos
St Christophers
St George Dragons
St Johns Eagles

In 1908 and 1909 the only districts with Junior Leagues were South Sydney and Balmain. The first clubs from the Canterbury district to participate in rugby league were Belmore in the NSWRL 2nd grade competition, and Campsie Triers in the Western Suburbs A Grade. When the St George JRL was established in 1911, Canterbury clubs were allocated to this competition. In 1922 the Canterbury JRL was established and Campsie Iona with 17 points edged out Wattle Hill 16 for the A Grade title, Lakemba won B Grade and Wattle Hill the C Grade. Campsie Iona repeated their A grade success in 1923, 1924 and 1925 before Belmore stopped their run in 1926.

Footnotes

References
 Blaschke B (2008). Steve Price – Be Your Best. Hachette Australia Publishing. 
 Woods B (2007). El Magic – The Life of Hazem El Masri. Harper Collins Publishing. 
 Andrews M (2006). The ABC of Rugby League. ABC Publishing. 
 Whiticker A & Hudson G (2005). Canterbury Bulldogs – The Encyclopedia of Rugby League Players. Bas Publishing. 
 Whittaker A & Collis I (2004). The History of Rugby League Clubs. 
 Lane D (1996). A Family Betrayal – One Man's Super League War – Jarrod McCracken. Ironbark Publishing. 
 Chesterton R (1996). Good as Gould – Phil Gould's Stormy Life in Football. Ironbark Publishing. 
 Lester G (1991). The Bulldog Story.  Publishing. 
 Whiticker A (1992). The Terry Lamb Story. Gary Allen Publishing. 
 Tasker N (1988). Top-Dog – The Steve Mortimer Story. Century Hutchinson Publishing. 
 Lester G (1985). Berries to Bulldogs. Lester – Townsend Publishing. 
 NRL Official Information Handbook (2001–2010). Season Guide.
 Middleton D (1987–2009). The Official NSWRL, ARL, NRL Yearbook / Annual.
 Christensen EE (1946–1977). NSWRL Yearbook.
 Rugby League Review (2003–2010).
 Big League (1974–2010).
 Rugby League Week (1970–2010).
 The Rugby League News.

External links

 
 Official Canterbury-Bankstown District Junior League
 Bulldogs Statistics
 Back to Belmore – The Official Campaign
 Canterbury-Bankstown Bulldogs contracted players
 Bulldogs Army

 
City of Canterbury-Bankstown
National Rugby League clubs
Rugby league teams in Sydney
Rugby clubs established in 1935
Fan-owned football clubs